Stratton is an unincorporated community in Dickenson County, Virginia, in the United States.

History
A post office was established at Stratton in 1887, and remained in operation until it was discontinued in 1963. The community was named for Frank A. Stratton, a local entrepreneur.

References

Unincorporated communities in Dickenson County, Virginia
Unincorporated communities in Virginia